The ATP 500 tournaments (previously known as the ATP World Tour 500 tournaments, ATP International Series Gold, and ATP Championship Series) are the fourth highest tier of annual men's tennis tournament after the four Grand Slam tournaments, ATP Finals, and the ATP Masters 1000. The series includes 13 tournaments, with 500 ranking points awarded for the events' singles champions – which accounts for the name of the series. Tournaments have various draws of 32 and 48 for singles and 16 and 24 for doubles. It is mandatory for leading players to enter at least four 500 events, including at least one after the US Open; if they play fewer than four, or fail to play in one after the US Open they get a "zero" score towards their world ranking for each one short.
Roger Federer holds the record for most singles titles at 24, while Daniel Nestor holds the record for most doubles titles won with 20. Rafael Nadal is very close to Roger Federer's record with 23 singles titles.

Historic names
1990–1999
ATP Championship Series

2000–2008
ATP International Series Gold

2009–2018
ATP World Tour 500

2019–present
ATP  Tour 500

ATP Points

Tournaments

Singles champions

ATP Championship Series

ATP International Series Gold

ATP World Tour 500

ATP Tour 500

Doubles champions

ATP Championship Series

ATP International Series Gold

ATP World Tour 500

ATP Tour 500

Statistics 
Active players indicated in bold.

Most titles

Notes

See also
 Grand Slam (tennis)
 ATP Finals
 ATP Tour Masters 1000
 ATP Tour 250

References

External links
 Association of Tennis Professionals (ATP) World Tour official website
 International Tennis Federation (ITF) official website